Hampton is an unincorporated locale in Lane County, Oregon, United States. It is located about 13 miles (21 km) southeast of Lowell. Hampton was established in 1952 as a station on the Southern Pacific Railroad Cascade Line (now the Union Pacific) on the shore of Lookout Point Lake, when the railroad was relocated because of the creation of the lake. It was named for Harry A. Hampton, the railroad division engineer from 1922 to 1943.

References

1952 establishments in Oregon
Unincorporated communities in Lane County, Oregon
Unincorporated communities in Oregon